The Republic of ShKID is an adventure, partly autobiographical children's novel by  and  written in 1926 and printed in 1927. 

The book is about the fate of Russian street boys (besprizorniks) who landed in the Fyodor Dostoyevsky School-Commune for Difficult Teenagers.  "ШКИД" (ShKID) stands for Школа-коммуна имени Достоевского ("").

In 1966 Lenfilm produced a movie The Republic of ShKID based on the novel.
In 2013 the novel was included into the list  recommended by the Ministry of Education and Science (Russia).

References

Russian children's books
Children's novels
Russian autobiographical novels
1927 Russian novels
Russian novels adapted into films
1927 children's books
Novels set in schools